Agricultural University of Hebei  . It is a public comprehensive university with the focus on areas of agriculture and forestry, engineering and life sciences. It was jointly established by the province and the ministry in Baoding, Hebei Province, the People's Republic of China.

External links 
Official website of AUH

Universities and colleges in Hebei
Agricultural universities and colleges in China